Solnechnoye is a municipal settlement in Kurortny District of the federal city of St. Petersburg, Russia, located on the Karelian Isthmus, on the northern shore of the Gulf of Finland. Population: 

Before the Winter War and Continuation War, it was a part of Finland and was located near the border with the Soviet Union.

References

Municipal settlements under jurisdiction of Saint Petersburg
Kurortny District
Karelian Isthmus